Jensen Ross Ackles (born March 1, 1978) is an American actor. He is best known for his portrayal of Dean Winchester in The WB/CW dark fantasy drama series Supernatural (2005–2020) and appearing in television series such as NBC's Days of Our Lives as Eric Brady (earning him several Daytime Emmy Award nominations), super soldiers Ben/X5-493 and Alec/X5-494 in Fox's Dark Angel, Jason Teague in The WB/CW's Smallville, and Ben/Soldier Boy in Amazon Prime Video's The Boys. He also starred as the lead in the box office success My Bloody Valentine 3D, and provided the voices of Jason Todd in the animated film Batman: Under the Red Hood, and Bruce Wayne/Batman in the animated adaptation of Batman: The Long Halloween.

Early life
Ackles was born on March 1 1978 in Dallas the son of Donna Joan (née Shaffer) and Alan Roger Ackles, an actor. He grew up in Richardson and attended Lloyd V. Berkner High School. After graduating in 1996, he moved to Los Angeles to begin his acting career.

Career
After modeling on and off since the age of four, Ackles began to concentrate on an acting career in 1996. He appeared in several guest roles on Mr. Rhodes, Sweet Valley High, and Cybill before joining the cast of the NBC soap opera Days of Our Lives as Eric Brady in 1997. He won a 1998 Soap Opera Digest Award for Best Male Newcomer and went on to be nominated three times (in 1998, 1999, and 2000) for a Daytime Emmy Award for Outstanding Younger Actor in a Drama Series for his work on Days of our Lives.

Ackles left Days of our Lives in 2000 and went on to appear in the mini-series Blonde, about the life of Marilyn Monroe. He also auditioned for the role of the young Clark Kent on Smallville, a role offered to actor Tom Welling instead. Next he appeared in a guest role on the James Cameron television series Dark Angel on Fox in 2001 as serial killer Ben/X5-493, the brother of main character Max/X5-452 (played by Jessica Alba). His character died in the episode, but Ackles returned to the show as a series regular in the second season as Ben's sane clone, Alec/X5-494. He remained with the show until its cancellation in 2002.

Ackles worked steadily throughout 2003. He joined the cast of The WB's hit show Dawson's Creek during its final season, playing CJ, Jen Lindley's lover. Afterward, Ackles filmed several episodes of the unaired series Still Life for Fox before it was abruptly dropped. He also had a small role in the 2004 short film The Plight of Clownana. Ackles was the producer's first choice to play Eliza Dushku's love interest on the second season of Tru Calling; Ackles turned down the role, which was then offered to Eric Christian Olsen and the character's name was changed to "Jensen" because the producers of Tru Calling liked Ackles' name. Ackles returned to Vancouver (where Dark Angel was filmed) in 2004 to become a regular on Smallville playing the assistant football coach Jason Teague, who was also the newest romantic interest for Lana Lang (played by Kristin Kreuk). He also had a lead role in the 2005 film Devour in which Ackles' father, actor Alan Ackles, also had a role playing the father of Ackles' character, Jake Gray.

In 2005, Ackles joined the cast of the WB show horror/action series Supernatural where he starred as Dean Winchester. Dean and his brother Sam (Jared Padalecki) drive throughout the United States hunting paranormal predators, fighting demons and angels, and showcasing fantasy & sci-fi pop culture. The show ended after fifteen seasons, making it the longest-running North American sci-fi series in history.

In the summer of 2007, Ackles took on the role of Priestly in the independent comedy Ten Inch Hero. The film began hitting the film festival circuit in early 2007 and Ackles received high praise for his comedic timing in the role. In February 2009, the film was released on DVD exclusively by Blockbuster Home Video. He also appeared on stage from June 5–10, 2007 with Lou Diamond Phillips in A Few Good Men at Casa Mañana Theatre in Fort Worth, Texas as Lt. Daniel Kaffee. Ackles received strong praise for his work in this role, which was also his professional theatre debut.

In the summer of 2008, Ackles was cast in the remake of the cult film My Bloody Valentine 3D, which opened nationwide on January 16, 2009.

In summer of 2010, as part of the DC Universe Animated Original Movies franchise, Ackles provided the voice for the Red Hood (Jason Todd) in the animated film, Batman: Under The Red Hood, which was released to DVD and Blu-ray on July 27. In summer of 2021, Ackles voiced the role of Batman (Bruce Wayne) for the two-part adaptation of Batman: The Long Halloween.

On October 22, 2010, Disney Interactive Studios announced he would be voicing a character named Gibson in the video game, Tron: Evolution which was released on December 7, 2010.

After years of performing at conventions, Ackles released his first original song as a professional singer titled "Sounds of Someday" which is the first track from his debut album. In 2018, Ackles collaborated with musician Steve Carlson to form Radio Company. Together Ackles and Carlson completed a debut album entitled Vol. 1. The album's first single was released on iTunes and the album was released in November 2019. Ackles and Carlson released Vol. 2 on May 7, 2021.

In August 2020, it was announced he would join the cast of The Boys in its third season as Ben / B.C.L. RED / Soldier Boy. 

More recently, he and his wife formed Chaos Machine Productions with a deal at Warner Bros. Television. In June 2021, it was revealed that they were developing a Supernatural prequel spinoff for The CW, titled The Winchesters, about young John and Mary Winchester, Sam and Dean's parents. Ackles would serve as narrator, reprising his role as Dean. It was picked up to series in May 2022.

In October 2021, Ackles was cast to play U.S. Marshal Wood Helm in the Western feature Rust, written and directed by Joel Souza. He played opposite Alec Baldwin, who starred in the title role. Production was temporarily suspended after the death of cinematographer Halyna Hutchins.

In May 2022, he guest starred on the ABC drama Big Sky'''s second season finale "Catch a Few Fish", as temporary sheriff Beau Arlen. The role was planted to be series regular for the show's third season, which was ordered the day after the episode aired.

Personal life

After three years of dating, Ackles became engaged to actress and model Danneel Harris in November 2009. The couple married on May 15, 2010, in Dallas. Their first child, a daughter, was born in May 2013. In August 2016, the couple announced that they were expecting twins, a boy and a girl who were born in December.

Ackles is a co-owner of a brewery in Dripping Springs, Texas, Family Business Beer Company, with his wife and in-laws. The brewery's name is a reference to Supernatural'' ("family business" being a tagline for the series).

Filmography

Film

Television

Video games

Director

Awards and nominations

References

External links

 
 
 
 

1978 births
Living people
Male actors from Dallas
American male film actors
Male models from Texas
American male soap opera actors
American male television actors
20th-century American male actors
21st-century American male actors
American male voice actors
American television directors
American people of English descent
American people of Irish descent
American people of Scottish descent
American people of German descent